Darowne  is a village in the administrative district of Gmina Opole Lubelskie, within Opole Lubelskie County, Lublin Voivodeship, in eastern Poland. It has a population of around 155 people.

References

Darowne